USS Cape Gloucester (CVE-109) was a Commencement Bay-class escort carrier of the United States Navy, in service from 5 March 1945 to 5 November 1946. After spending another 25 years in the reserve fleet, the ship was scrapped in 1971.

Service history
Cape Gloucester (name changed from Willapa Bay on 26 April 1944) was launched on 12 September 1944 by Todd-Pacific Shipyards, Inc., Tacoma, Washington; sponsored by Mrs. R. M. Griffin; commissioned on 5 March 1945, Captain J. W. Harris in command; and reported to the Pacific Fleet.

After operational training at Pearl Harbor, Cape Gloucester arrived at Leyte, P.I. on 29 June 1945 to join the 3rd Fleet. Her planes flew combat air patrol fighting off Japanese kamikazes attempting to attack minesweepers operating east of Okinawa from 5–17 July. They then took part in air raids and photographic reconnaissance of shipping and airfields along the China coast until 7 August. During this time, her aircraft shot down several Japanese planes, and aided in damaging a 700-ton cargo ship.

After a period covering minesweeping along the Japanese coasts, and just two weeks after the Japanese formally surrendered on board the U.S.S. Missouri on 2 September 1945, the Cape Gloucester sailed into Nagasaki, stripped of her planes, to serve as an early participant in the celebrated "Magic Carpet" fleet that returned thousands of ragged and half-starved prisoners of war from Australia, New Zealand, Britain and Holland, together with a handful of Americans, to their homes.  Many of these POWs were from prison camps on Kyūshū.  In that role, Cape Gloucester sailed to Okinawa to unload the allied POWs, and made four voyages returning U.S. servicemen from Okinawa and Pearl Harbor to the west coast. The escort carrier returned to Tacoma, Wash., 22 May 1946, and was placed out of commission in reserve there on 5 November 1946. Still in reserve, she was reclassified CVHE-109 on 12 June 1955, and further reclassified AKV-9 on 7 May 1959.

Awards
Cape Gloucester received one battle star for her World War II service.

References

 

Commencement Bay-class escort carriers
World War II escort aircraft carriers of the United States
Ships built in Tacoma, Washington
1944 ships